Archerfield was an electoral district of the Legislative Assembly in the Australian state of Queensland from 1972 to 2001.

The district was based in the south-western suburbs of Brisbane and named for the suburb of Archerfield.

Members for Archerfield
The members for Archerfield were:

Election results

See also
 Electoral districts of Queensland
 Members of the Queensland Legislative Assembly by year
 :Category:Members of the Queensland Legislative Assembly by name

References

Former electoral districts of Queensland
1972 establishments in Australia
2001 disestablishments in Australia
Constituencies established in 1972
Constituencies disestablished in 2001